Adoration and Life Ministry is a Catholic music group from Brazil, founded in São José dos Campos in 2005, by the musician Walmir Alencar. Adoration and Life is among the most well-known Catholic groups of the country. According to the ministry's own website, its mission is "to turn the stage into an altar, where the love of God is experienced by every human being who wishes to have a personal encounter with the Lord." Among its most famous songs are: "Abraço de Pai", "Gratidão" and "Hoje Livre Sou", "Deus Imenso " and "Em Teu Altar."

In 2012, singer Fátima Souza left the group because she was pregnant, continued with a solo career.

Members

Discography

In addition to these, the ministry has also released the EP "Mais do Que Vencedor", which features 5 songs, and the single "Que Entre o Rei".

References

Brazilian Roman Catholic musical groups